Rajakilpakkam is a neighbourhood area of Chennai to the south of the city, officially a part of Tambaram Municipal Corporation from November 3rd 2021, formerly a part of Sembakkam municipality, in Tamil Nadu, India.  Its post code is 600 073.

Madambakkam High Road connects from Velachery Road at Rajakilpakkam, leading to the community of Nuthanchery.  Rajakilpakkam connects nearby areas like Sembakkam, Kamarajapuram, Maruthy Nagar, Mahalakshminagar, Madambakkam.

Located 4 km from Madras Christian College, the place is a hub of various religious communities. There is the  temple of Lord Shiva, and the newly commissioned Mahameru temple, featuring an assembly of "Sithars".

A temple dedicated to Lord Anjaneyar (son of Anjana, so Hanuman) is the Maruthy Nagar Anjaneyar Temple.  The temple currently also has a dedicated sanctum for Lord Rama positioned opposite to Lord Anjaneyar within the temple.  There is a masjid (mosque) in vallal syed yusuf nagar.

Banks in Rajakilpakkam
Indian Bank, Bank of Baroda, HDFC Bank, Andhra Bank, KMBF,
ICICI Bank, City Union Bank, IOB

ATMs
State Bank of India, Bank of Baroda, Indian Bank, HDFC, KVB, CUB, ICICI, Axis, IOB, PNB, Andhra Bank

Super Markets
Nilgris, More, Jayam,  Divyam Patanjali, Srinivasan, Nellai Kalyani

Restaurants
Shah Restaurant(Pure Halaal Contact: +91 9514767245), Al-reef, Gnanambals Kitchen, Famous Biriyani(Velachery Main Road Opp to Alpha Higher Secondary School), Papa Johns, GK Veg Restaurant, Ambur Star Biriyani (Rajakilpakkam Signal), Rice N Noodles

Bakery
 New Grand Bakery(Near Kamarajapuram bus stop),Gananpathy Bakery ( 3 branches) at Madambakkam Main Rd.

Clinics
Sushaanth Homoeo Clinic (+919790731224) (Dr.R. Vijayashanthini, BHMS, MD, PDG(Acu)) (Near to Andhra Bank);
Apollo; 
Mothers Care Homoeo Clinic (Opp to Jain housing),
Vijaya Lakshmi Clinic (Dr. Senthil Kumar)
Cherub Infertility Clinic (Dr. Florence, MBBS, DGO) (VGP Saraswathi Nagar, Rajakilpakkam)
JM AYURVEDA Aarogya Sowkiyam- Gokul Nagar ( Near KV2 / Jeyam Supermarket.)
Vaitheeswaran Paediatric Clinic (Nearby More supermarket). New Life Hospital near Rajakilpakkam signal.

References

Neighbourhoods in Chennai